The 1918 Washington University Pikers football team was an American football team that represented Washington University in St. Louis as a member of the Missouri Valley Conference during the 1918 college football season. In its second season under head coach R. B. Rutherford, the team compiled a perfect 6–0 record and won the Missouri Valley Conference S.A.T.C. championship.

Schedule

References

Washington University
Washington University Bears football seasons
Missouri Valley Conference football champion seasons
College football undefeated seasons
Washington University Pikers football